Deh-e Molla Bozorg (also Romanized as Deh-e Mollā Bozorg, Deh Mollā Bozorg, and Deh Mollā-ye Bozorg; also known as Deh Mollā and Deh Mulla) is a village in Soviren Rural District, Cham Khalaf-e Isa District, Hendijan County, Khuzestan Province, Iran. At the 2006 census, its population was 1,031, in 218 families.

References 

Populated places in Hendijan County